Sports Palace Aukštaitija is an indoor sporting arena located in Panevėžys, Lithuania.  The capacity of the arena is 2,000 people.  It was formerly home to the KK Panevėžys basketball team, later renamed to BC Techasas of the premier domestic league LKL.

Indoor arenas in Lithuania
Buildings and structures in Panevėžys
Sport in Panevėžys
Culture in Panevėžys